The men's 10 metre air pistol event at the 2018 Asian Games in Palembang, Indonesia took place on 21 August at the Jakabaring International Shooting Range.

Schedule
All times are Western Indonesia Time (UTC+07:00)

Records

Results
Legend
DNS — Did not start

Qualification

Final

References

External links
Schedule

Men's 10 metre air pistol